Toad Suck Daze is an annual community music, arts, and food festival in Conway, Arkansas.  It takes place every year in downtown Conway and has been celebrated for over 30 years.

Overview
The Toad Suck Daze festival attracts an estimated 160,000 visitors each year. Notable attractions at the event include music, arts and crafts, a variety of food, carnival rides, and toad races. For these races, visitors enter toads that they have brought from home or that were bred in the community for this purpose. The festival raises money to give educational scholarships to Faulkner County citizens.

History
First organized in 1981 in Perry County (Toad Suck Park), the festival is held annually in downtown Conway, Arkansas (Faulkner County), during the first weekend in May.  Originally held in Toad Suck at Toad Suck Park on the Perry County side near the Toad Suck Ferry Lock and Dam, the festival was moved to the downtown location in 1990 due to flooding at the river, and it has remained in the downtown area ever since.  The festival is run by volunteers from Conway and Faulkner County, including the local police and fire departments.

Name origin
The legend behind Toad Suck refers to the time when steamboats traveled the Arkansas River. When the water was not deep enough, the steamboats tied up where the Toad Suck Ferry Lock and Dam now spans the river near Conway. While captain and crew waited, they loitered over refreshments at the local tavern. People living nearby commented, "They suck on the bottle 'til they swell up like toads."

References to Toad Suck Daze in popular culture
 The Colbert Report
 The Tonight Show

References

External links
 Downtown Conway guide
 Toad Suck Daze official website

Tourist attractions in Faulkner County, Arkansas
Conway, Arkansas
Music festivals in Arkansas